Space Crew is a real-time strategy video game developed by Runner Duck and published by Curve Digital. It was released on Microsoft Windows, OS X, Linux, PlayStation 4, Xbox One and Nintendo Switch on 15 October 2020. It is the sequel to the game Bomber Crew, released in 2017. An update, Space Crew: Legendary Edition, was released in October 2021, which featured a new campaign.

Gameplay
The player gives commands to their crew to take them through a campaign of missions set in the solar system and beyond. New upgrades and equipment become unlocked, and crew members can gain new skills as the game progresses. The Space Crew: Legendary Edition update adds new gameplay features, including missions where the player's crew leave the ship to explore outposts featuring enemies and puzzles.

Reception

The game received mixed or average reviews, according to review aggregator Metacritic.

References 

PlayStation 4 games
2020 video games
MacOS games
Video games developed in the United Kingdom
Military science fiction video games
Science fiction video games
Windows games
Xbox One games
Nintendo Switch games
Curve Games games
Single-player video games
Runner Duck games